Cosmoclostis hemiadelpha is a species of moth of the family Pterophoridae described by Thomas Bainbrigge Fletcher in 1947. It is found in Australia in Queensland and in New Guinea.

References

External links
Papua Insects

Pterophorini
Moths of Australia
Moths of New Guinea
Moths described in 1947